Vincent Forge Mansion, also known as Young's Forge Mansion and Kerry Dell Farm, is a historic home located in East Vincent Township, Chester County, Pennsylvania.  It was built about 1770, and is a -story, five-bay by two-bay, stone dwelling with a gable roof and pent.  It was originally the ironmaster's home and office at an 18th-century iron forge.  The forge operated from about 1760 to 1800. The house later became a farm house.  In 1925, the property was sold to the Catholic Church for use as a boy's summer camp.  The camp closed in the late-1970s.

The house was added to the National Register of Historic Places in 1985.

References

Houses on the National Register of Historic Places in Pennsylvania
Houses completed in 1770
Houses in Chester County, Pennsylvania
National Register of Historic Places in Chester County, Pennsylvania
1770 establishments in Pennsylvania